Duplex sumbawensis is a moth of the family Erebidae first described by Michael Fibiger in 2008. It is known from Sumbawa island of Indonesia.

The wingspan is about 8.5 mm. The forewing is greyish brown, although the basal costal area is blackish brown and the medial area dark grey, the upper half darker and the postmedial area is brownish. The reniform stigma is relatively weakly marked. The crosslines are indistinct and dark brown. The terminal line is weakly marked by brown interveinal spots. The hindwing is dark grey, with an indistinct discal spot. The underside of the forewing is light brown and the underside of the hindwing is light grey with a discal spot.

References

Micronoctuini
Taxa named by Michael Fibiger
Moths described in 2011